Pleistarchus or Plistarch (fl.313–287 BC) was son of Antipater and brother of Cassander, king of Macedonia. As well as an Antipatrid general, he served as an independent dynast of Cilicia and then Caria in later life.

He is first mentioned in the year 313 BC, when he was left by his brother in the command of Chalcis, to make headway against Ptolemy, the general of Antigonus, when Cassander himself was recalled to the defence of Macedonia. Again, in 302 BC, when the general coalition was formed against Antigonus, Pleistarchus was sent forward by his brother, with an army 12,000 foot and 500 horse, to join Lysimachus in Asia. As the Hellespont and entrance of the Euxine was occupied by Demetrius, he endeavoured to transport his troops from Odessus directly to Heraclea, but lost by far the greater part on the passage, some having been captured by the enemy's ships, while others perished in a storm, in which Pleistarchus himself narrowly escaped shipwreck. Notwithstanding this misfortune, he seems to have rendered efficient service to the confederates, for which he was rewarded after the battle of Ipsus (301 BC) by obtaining the province of Cilicia, as an independent government. This, however, he did not long retain, being expelled from it in the following year by Demetrius, almost without opposition. 

Afterwards he is recorded in inscriptions as the ruler of Caria; he was apparently given this province after the battle of Ipsus, and ruled there for at least seven years. His predecessor in Caria was Eupolemus. There is no evidence of his rule outside northern Caria, and he was in competition with Ptolemaic interests to the south. His capital in Caria was Heraclea at Latmus, which was briefly renamed to Pleistarchea (Πλεισταρχεία). Both Heraclea/Pleistarchea and nearby Hyllarima were fortified by Pleistarchus in the 290s BC. An inscription from the sanctuary of Sinuri near Mylasa shows that Pleistarchus' power was respected at least this far south.

Pausanias mentions him as having been defeated by the Athenians in an action in which he commanded the cavalry and auxiliaries of Cassander; but the period at which this event took place is uncertain. 

It is perhaps to him that the medical writer, Diocles of Carystus, addressed his work, which is cited more than once by Athenaeus, as τα προς Πλεισταρχον Υγιεινα.

References
Smith, William; Dictionary of Greek and Roman Biography and Mythology, "Pleistarchus (2)", Boston, (1867)

Notes

Antipatrid generals
4th-century BC Macedonians
Antipatrid dynasty